"Heart Attack" is a song recorded by English-born Australian singer Olivia Newton-John for her second greatest hits album Olivia's Greatest Hits Vol. 2 (1982). Written by Paul Bliss and Steve Kipner, and produced by John Farrar, the song was the first single released from the album and was nominated for a Grammy Award for Best Female Pop Vocal Performance in 1983.

Charts

Weekly charts

Year-end charts

Certifications and sales

Cover versions
In 1983, Alvin and the Chipmunks covered the song for their TV series episode "Angelic Alvin" (with new lyrics created for the episode).

Notes 
White Label promotional copy same track repeats on both sides.
Also has catalog # MCA-52155 on label.
Produced For Buffalo Music.
Management Roger Davies.
From the MCA LP, MCA-5347, "Olivia's Greatest Hits Vol. 2"

References

1983 singles
Olivia Newton-John songs
MCA Records singles
1982 songs
Songs written by Steve Kipner
Song recordings produced by John Farrar